The Sam and Irene Black School of Business is the business school of Penn State Behrend, a four-year college of Penn State University. The Black School was founded in 1998 when the Black family donated a gift of $20 million to the college. The school is located in the Jack Burke Research and Economic Development Center on the Behrend campus.

Degrees
The college is accredited in business and accounting by the Association to Advance Collegiate Schools of Business (AACSB).

See also
 List of United States business school rankings
 List of business schools in the United States

References

External links
Penn State University
Pennsylvania State University – Erie, The Behrend College

Penn State Erie, The Behrend College
Pennsylvania State University
Business schools in Pennsylvania
Educational institutions established in 1998
1998 establishments in Pennsylvania